Cahaba, Marion and Greensboro Railroad Company was incorporated under act of Alabama on February 9, 1850, as The Marion and Alabama River Transportation Company.

On February 2, 1854, the name of the company was changed to The Marion Railroad Company. On February 6, 1858, the name of the company was changed to Marion and Cahaba Railroad Company. On February 2, 1860, the name of the company was changed to Cahaba, Marion and Greensboro Railroad Company.

On December 31, 1868, Cahaba, Marion and Greensboro Railroad Company bought the Northwestern Rail Road Company of Alabama, which had been incorporated under act of Alabama on February 20, 1854. The Northwestern Rail Road Company of Alabama built  of railroad line between Uniontown, Alabama and Newbern, Alabama in 1863 and 1864. The property was operated from the time of its construction until the time of its sale by The Selma and Meridian Railroad Company. Upon purchase of this line, Cahaba, Marion and Greensboro Railroad Company abandoned the mileage and took up the rails.

On December 31, 1868, the name of the company was changed to The Selma, Marion and Memphis Railroad Company (of Alabama). On March 17, 1871, the company was consolidated with Selma, Marion and Memphis Company (of Mississippi and Tennessee) to form The Selma, Marion and Memphis Railroad Company. The Selma, Marion and Memphis Railroad Company was sold at foreclosure on August 12, 1878 and conveyed on December 24, 1878 to Selma and Greensboro Railroad Company, which had been incorporated on December 2, 1878. The name of the company was changed to Cincinnati, Selma and Mobile Railway Company on December 17, 1881.

The company was sold to East Tennessee, Virginia and Georgia Railroad Company on February 19, 1890.

The property eventually became part of Southern Railway Company on July 7, 1894, through its acquisition of the East Tennessee, Virginia and Georgia Railway Company.

See also 

 Confederate railroads in the American Civil War

Notes

References 

 Interstate Commerce Commission. Southern Ry. Co., Volume 37, Interstate Commerce Commission Valuation Reports, November 6, 1931. Washington: United States Government Printing Office, 1932 ..

Defunct Alabama railroads
Predecessors of the Southern Railway (U.S.)
Railway companies established in 1856
Railway companies disestablished in 1871
5 ft gauge railways in the United States
American companies established in 1856
American companies disestablished in 1871